Asegur is a village and alqueria located in the municipality of Nuñomoral, in Cáceres province, Extremadura, Spain. As of 2020, it has a population of 96.

Geography 
Asegur is located 181km north of Cáceres, Spain.

References

Populated places in the Province of Cáceres